Kalju Komissarov (8 March 1946 Võru – 6 March 2017) was an Estonian actor, theatre and film director, and theatre pedagogue.

In 1968 he graduated from Tallinn State Conservatory. 1968-1974 he worked as a film director at Tallinnfilm. 1974-1986 he was the principal stage manager at Noorsooteater, and 1986-1988 at Ugala Theatre. 1986-1995 he was the head of Estonian Music and Theatre Academy's Higher Theatre School.

In 2006 he was awarded with Order of the White Star, III class.

Komissarov was married to actress and former Tallinn State Conservatory classmate Helle-Reet Helenurm from 1967 until 1971.

Selected filmography

 1967 Keskpäevane praam (feature film; role: Boy in Moskvich)
 1989 Viimne reliikvia  (feature film; role: Monk)
 1970 Valge laev (feature film; role: Enn Alling)
 1971 Metskapten (feature film; role: ?)
 1973 Tavatu lugu (feature film; role: Young inspector)
 1980 Ideaalmaastik (feature film; role: Secretary of district committee)
 1997 Minu Leninid (feature film; role: Russian gendarme official)
 2006 Meeletu  (feature film; role: Parish mayor)
 2006-2012 Kelgukoerad (television series; role: Kelk)

References

1946 births
2017 deaths
Estonian male film actors
Estonian male stage actors
Estonian male television actors
Estonian film directors
Estonian theatre directors
Recipients of the Order of the White Star, 3rd Class
Estonian Academy of Music and Theatre alumni
Academic staff of the Estonian Academy of Music and Theatre
People from Võru